The Heechee Saga, also known as the Gateway series, is a series of science fiction novels and short stories by Frederik Pohl. The Heechee are an advanced alien race that visited the Solar System hundreds of millennia ago and then mysteriously disappeared. They left behind bases containing artifacts, including working starships, which are discovered and exploited by humanity.

Plot summary
A prospector on Venus finds an abandoned Heechee spaceship and launches it, with himself aboard. The ship automatically returns to a hollowed out asteroid within the Solar System, later named Gateway. Before he dies from lack of food and water, he manages to signal the rest of humanity his location. On Gateway is a priceless treasure: nearly a thousand small starships, many of them still functional. They come in three sizes, barely capable of carrying one, three or five passengers along with supplies.

The Gateway Corporation takes control of the asteroid on behalf of the United States, the Soviet Union, the New People's Asia, the Venusian Confederation, and the United States of Brazil. Through trial and error, they figure out how to use the ships, but not well enough to set the terminus and duration of a trip. Individuals and groups are allowed to depart on these ships, risking (and often losing) their lives in the hope of finding something at their unknown destination that will make them rich.

As the series progresses, humans are able to use and sometimes reverse engineer Heechee artifacts, including a working Heechee plant that converts simple elements into food. Eventually, they encounter the Heechee themselves and find out they are hiding from a race of beings of pure energy, who are working to reverse the Big Bang and reform the universe in a form that suits them better through a second Big Bang.

Publication history
The original Heechee novella, "The Merchants of Venus" (sometimes called "The Merchants of Venus Underground"), was published in the July–August 1972 issue of Worlds of If – or If, a magazine Pohl had edited from 1961 to 1969 – and almost simultaneously in The Gold at the Starbow's End (Ballantine Books, 1972), a collection of short fiction by Pohl. The 1972 magazine story was illustrated by Jack Gaughan.

Five novels published from 1977 to 2004 also feature the Heechee:
 Gateway. The story was initially serialized in Galaxy beginning November 1976, with illustrations by Vincent DiFate, and was published as a book by St. Martin's Press in April 1977. Translations into French, German, Dutch, and Italian were all published during 1978 and 1979.
 Beyond the Blue Event Horizon (Del Rey, 1980)
 Heechee Rendezvous (Del Rey, 1984). It was serialized in Amazing Science Fiction from January 1984, with illustrations by Jack Gaughan.
 The Annals of the Heechee (Del Rey, 1987)
 The Boy Who Would Live Forever: A Novel of Gateway (Tor Books, 2004)

In 1990, nine new short stories were published in the first three 1990 issues of Aboriginal Science Fiction. They and "The Merchants of Venus" made up an all-Heechee collection, The Gateway Trip: Tales and Vignettes of the Heechee (Del Rey Books); both the serial and the book, also released in 1990, were illustrated by Frank Kelly Freas.

A German-language edition of the first three novels was published 20 years later as "The Gateway Trilogy": Die Gateway-Trilogie (Munich: Heyne Verlag, 2004). The Boy Who Would Live Forever incorporated three previously published stories:
 "The Boy Who Would Live Forever", Far Horizons, ed. Robert Silverberg (Avon Books, May 1999), pp. 295–342
 "Hatching the Phoenix", illustrated by Vincent DiFate, Amazing Stories, Fall 1999, pp. 32–43, and Winter 2000, pp. 84–96
 "A Home for the Old Ones", Science Fiction: DAW 30th Anniversary (DAW Books, May 2002), pp. 159–74

Other media
Gateway, a series of two video games, was released in 1992 and 1993 by Legend Entertainment.

On January 6, 2019; Skybound Entertainment announced that they have reached an agreement to option Frederik Pohl’s 1977 science fiction novel, Gateway. The deal includes all other volumes in the Heechee saga. Although without a time frame for it, Skybound plans to produce a TV series based on Gateway.

Reception 
Gateway, the first novel and second publication in the series, won four major awards as the year's best English-language speculative fiction or science fiction novel: the 1978 Hugo Award for Best Novel, the 1978 Locus Award for Best Novel, the 1977 Nebula Award for Best Novel, and the 1978 John W. Campbell Memorial Award for Best Science Fiction Novel. Publishers Weekly stated that "Since it began with the novel Gateway (1977), Pohl's Heechee series has been among the most consistently daring of SF's continuing enterprises".

Notes

References

External links

 Frederik Pohl at the Science Fiction Awards Database 
Review of the game Frederik Pohl's Gateway at Adventure Classic Gaming (1998)
Review of the game Gateway II: Homeworld (1998)
 Reviews of the last three novels at Kirkus Reviews (1984 to 2004): Heechee Rendezvous (negative); The Annals of the Heechee (exceptionally negative); The Boy Who Would Live Forever (starred)

Book series introduced in 1977
Science fiction book series